Drepanogynis is a genus in the geometer moth family (Geometridae). Long considered to hold about 5 dozen species, this number has been doubled after the last major revision. They are stout-bodied and hairy by geometer moth standards, usually have pale hindwings and rest with their wings angled upwards like a roof, as Nacophorini do. The genus is by and large restricted to Africa south of the Equator, with most species occurring in southern Africa.

This genus belongs to the subfamily Ennominae. Therein, its relationships are not quite clear, but they may indeed belong into the tribe Nacophorini. These they resemble in general appearance as mentioned above, as well as having an anellus with lateral processes, a simple rodlike uncus, a strong gnathos, simple valvae and an aedeagus with separate cornuti. Closely related genera seem to be Argyrophora, Hebdomophruda, Microligia and Pseudomaenas.

Selected species
Species of Drepanogynis include:
 Drepanogynis bifasciata  (Dewitz, 1881)
 Drepanogynis cervina (Warren, 1894)
 Drepanogynis curvaria  (Dewitz, 1881)
 Drepanogynis fuscimargo (Warren, 1898)
 Drepanogynis herbuloti Viette, 1970
 Drepanogynis hypoplea Prout, 1938
 Drepanogynis hypopyrrha (Prout, 1932)
 Drepanogynis incogitata Prout, 1915
 Drepanogynis itremo Viette, 1974
 Drepanogynis miltodes Krüger, 2005
 Drepanogynis mixtaria Guenée, 1857
 Drepanogynis nephelochroa Krüger, 2005
 Drepanogynis nicotiana Viette, 1977
 Drepanogynis peyrierasi Viette, 1974
 Drepanogynis protactosema Prout, 1932
 Drepanogynis styx Krüger, 2005
 Drepanogynis subrosea  Krüger, 2002
 Drepanogynis synclinia 	(Prout, 1938)
 Drepanogynis tabacicolor 	Krüger, 2002
 Drepanogynis tenoris 	(Prout, 1934)
 Drepanogynis tigrinata 	Viette, 1972
 Drepanogynis tornimacula 	Herbulot, 1957
 Drepanogynis trachyacta 	(Prout, 1922)
 Drepanogynis tripartita (Warren, 1898)
 Drepanogynis tsaratanana 	Viette, 1980
 Drepanogynis unilineata 	(Warren, 1897)
 Drepanogynis valida 	(Warren, 1914) 
 Drepanogynis vara 	Prout, 1922
 Drepanogynis variciliata 	Krüger, 2002
 Drepanogynis villaria 	(Felder & Rogenhofer, 1875)
 Drepanogynis viridipennis 	Krüger, 2002
 Drepanogynis viridipilosa 	Krüger, 2002
 Drepanogynis xanthographa 	Krüger, 2002
 Drepanogynis xylophanes 	Krüger, 2002

Footnotes

References
  (2005): New species of geometrid moths from Lesotho (Lepidoptera: Geometroidea: Geometridae). Annals of the Transvaal Museum 42: 19-45. HTML abstract
  (2004a): Butterflies and Moths of the World, Generic Names and their Type-species – Apleroneura. Version of 2004-NOV-05. Retrieved 2011-APR-21.
  (2004b): Butterflies and Moths of the World, Generic Names and their Type-species – Drepanogynis. Version of 2004-NOV-05. Retrieved 2011-APR-21.
  (2004c): Butterflies and Moths of the World, Generic Names and their Type-species – Phrudochorda. Version of 2004-NOV-05. Retrieved 2011-APR-21.
  (2009): Markku Savela's Lepidoptera and some other life forms – Drepanogynis. Version of 2009-JUL-17. Retrieved 2011-APR-21.
  (2008): Characterisation of the Australian Nacophorini using adult morphology, and phylogeny of the Geometridae based on morphological characters. Zootaxa 1736: 1-141. PDF abstract and excerpt

Ennominae
Geometridae genera